Ernest Jones is a British jeweller and watchmaker. Established in 1949 by Ernest and Stella Weinstein, its first store was opened in Oxford Street, London. Ernest Jones specialises in diamonds and watches, stocking brands such as Breitling SA, Omega SA, TAG Heuer, Cartier SA, Gucci, and Emporio Armani. Ernest Jones is part of the Signet Jewelers group and has approximately 180 stores across the United Kingdom.

References

External links
Official Ernest Jones website

Jewellery retailers of the United Kingdom
British companies established in 1949
Retail companies established in 1949
Retail companies based in London
1949 establishments in England